Sebastian Schachten (born 6 November 1984) is a German former professional footballer who played as a defender.

Career
Schachten was born in Bad Karlshafen. After his expiring contract with 2. Bundesliga side FC St. Pauli had not been renewed, Schachten moved to Swiss FC Luzern on a free transfer. He signed a two-year contract until 2017.

References

External links
 
 

1984 births
Living people
People from Kassel (district)
Sportspeople from Kassel (region)
Footballers from Hesse
German footballers
Association football defenders
Bundesliga players
2. Bundesliga players
3. Liga players
Swiss Super League players
SC Paderborn 07 players
SV Werder Bremen II players
Borussia Mönchengladbach players
Borussia Mönchengladbach II players
FC St. Pauli players
FC Luzern players
FSV Frankfurt players
German expatriate footballers
German expatriate sportspeople in Switzerland
Expatriate footballers in Switzerland